Lauren Wood, released in 1979, is the first eponymous album by Lauren Wood. It features her Chunky, Novi & Ernie bandmates Novi Novog (her cousin), and bassist Ernie Emerita. The disc is studded with guest stars including Little Feat members Bill Payne and Fred Tackett, Steve Lukather, Ronnie Montrose and Jim Keltner. Her duet with Michael McDonald, "Please Don't Leave", went to #5 on Billboard's Adult Contemporary chart and #24 on the Pop Singles chart.

Track listing 
All songs written by Lauren Wood except "Nothin' But a Heartache" by Michael McDonald and "Dirty Work" by Donald Fagen and Walter Becker
 "Please Don't Leave" (3:58)  Vocals - Lauren Wood, Michael McDonald; Piano, Synthesizer solo - Bill Payne
 "Save the Man" (4:19)  Guitar solo - Jay Graydon; Viola - Novi; Syndrums - Alvin Taylor
 "Hollywood" (5:12)  Guitar solo - Summer Mering; Synthesizer solo - Novi
 "Nothin' But a Heartache" (3:50)  Saxophone solo - John Klemmer; Background vocals - Wood, McDonald, John Townsend, Rosemary Butler, Bobby LaKind
 "Gotta Lotta" (4:03)  Synthesizer intro - Duncan Mackay; Saxophone solo - Andrew Love; Horns - Love and Ben Cauley
 "Where Did I Get These Tears" (4:31)  Viola solo - Novi
 "Dirty Work" (3:44)  Guitar solo - Ronnie Montrose; Synthesizer - Mackay; Background vocals - Wood, McDonald, Townsend, Butler, Patrick Simmons
 "Time Zone" (5:52) Synthesizer - Novi; Background vocals - Wood, McDonald, Townsend, Butler, LaKind
 "Overload " (4:31) Acoustic piano and all vocals - Wood; String arrangement - Novi

Personnel
Lauren "Chunky" Wood - lead vocals
Lauren "Chunky" Wood, Bill Payne, Jai Winding - keyboards
Jeff Porcaro, Jim Keltner, Alvin Taylor, Michael Baird, Rick Shlosser - drums
Ernie Emerita, Abraham Laboriel, David Hungate - bass 
Steve Lukather, Fred Tackett, Jay Graydon, Ronnie Montrose, Sumner Mering - guitars 
Novi, Bill Payne, Duncan Mackay - synthesizer 
Novi - viola  
John Klemmer, Andrew Love - saxophone 
Marcy Dicterow Vaj - concertmistress
Paul Lani, Steve Forman, Bobby LaKind, Michael J. Jackson, Sinclair Rogers Lott III, Debra Dobkin - percussion 
Bill Champlin, Arno Lucas, Bobby Kimball, Lauren "Chunky" Wood, John Townsend, Michael McDonald, Pat Simmons, Ricardo de Campas, Ki-Ki Koury, Rosemary Butler -  additional background vocals

Production
 Produced by Michael J. Jackson, "Please Don't Leave" produced by Jackson and Ted Templeman
 Engineered by James Isaacson

References
 Lauren Wood; "Lauren Wood" liner notes; Warner Bros. Records 1979
 [ All Music Guide]

1979 debut albums
Warner Records albums